The Type 3 "anti-tank" hand grenade is a Japanese grenade produced from 1943 to 1945 during World War II.
It was designed to destroy the Allies' tanks. There are three variants (sub-types) of the weapon: Ko (Type A), Otsu (Type B), and Hei (Type C).

History
Throughout World War II, the U.S bombings gradually degraded the Japanese munition manufacturing base. Manufacturers were soon forced to find new, inexpensive and creative ways to produce grenades. Contrary to the Russians or Germans, the heavy armor threat was not very present, thus explaining the late development of the hollow charge. The Type 3 had a simplistic design and was made from expendable materials. This made the weapon relatively easy to produce.

This Japanese grenade is extremely hard to find today.

Design
The Type 3 has an odd and cheap appearance. It has a tear drop-like shape. The grenade consists of a thin steel cone mounted on a wooden standoff head. The explosive is cast around the cone and covered by a cloth bag made of either silk or hemp twine. The upper extremity is made of a very basic impact firing mechanism. The hemp tail attached at the top serves as a stabilizer for when the grenade is in flight, thus ensuring that the target is struck successfully. When thrown, the Type 3's twine seemed to create a tail-like skirt.

The grenade has a penetration power of 70 mm. This shows that it exceeds the penetration of the Type 99 magnetic grenade.

Sub-Types
There are three official variants of the Type 3 hand grenade.

Ko (Type A)
This variant has a length of 17.3 cm, a diameter of 11 cm and a weight of 1270 grams. The explosive filling is RDX/TNA and has a weight of 853 grams. The colour of the sack is either white or brown-yellow.

Otsu (Type B)
This variant has a length of 14.8 cm, a diameter of 10 cm and a weight of 853 grams. The explosive filling is PETN and TNT and has a weight of 690 grams. The colour of the sack is either white or brown-yellow.

Hei (Type C)
This variant has a length of 15 cm, a diameter of 10 cm and a weight of 830 grams. The explosive filling is Picric acid and has a weight of 690 grams. The colour of the sack is yellow.

Sources

99
43
Anti-tank grenades
Hand grenades of Japan
Weapons and ammunition introduced in 1943